William Mganga Ngeleja (born 5 October 1967) is a Tanzanian CCM politician and Member of Parliament for Sengerema constituency since 2005.

References

1967 births
Living people
Chama Cha Mapinduzi MPs
Tanzanian MPs 2005–2010
Tanzanian MPs 2010–2015
Mpwapwa Secondary School alumni
Ihungo Secondary School alumni
University of Dar es Salaam alumni
PricewaterhouseCoopers people